Kasthuriraani d/o Patto (born 9 August 1979) is a Malaysian politician from the Democratic Action Party (DAP), a component party of the Pakatan Harapan (PH) opposition coalition. She served as the Member of Parliament (MP) for Batu Kawan from May 2013 to November 2022. She has served as the Assistant International Secretary of DAP since March 2022 and President of the Parliamentarians for Global Action (PGA) since December 2021 as well as Member of the Steering Group for the International Panel of Parliamentarians for the Freedom of Religion and Belief.

Personal life
Kasthuriraani is the daughter of Mary Patto and the late Patto Perumal; a former senior DAP politician and Member of Parliament. She has one sister, named Shaalini Anne Patto. She was engaged with her French boyfriend on 4 May 2022 and got married on 6 May.

Politics
In the 2013 general election, Kasthuriraani Patto was elected as Malaysian member of parliament for P46 Batu Kawan constituency. She was famously known for fighting for female rights in the parliament.

In the 2018 general election, she was reelected again with a higher majority. 

In 2022, she decided to not defend her seat to make way for new leader. She was succeeded by Chow Kon Yeow, the Chief Minister of Penang.

Election results

See also

 Batu Kawan (federal constituency)

References

Living people
1979 births
People from Ipoh
People from Perak
Malaysian Christians
Malaysian politicians of Indian descent
Democratic Action Party (Malaysia) politicians
Members of the Dewan Rakyat
Women members of the Dewan Rakyat
Women in Penang politics
21st-century Malaysian politicians
21st-century Malaysian women politicians